Mykola (Nikolai) Serhiyovych Bondar (22 May 1990 – 15 February 2020) was a Ukrainian competitive figure skater. He competed in the final segment at two World Junior Championships, achieving his best result, 11th, in 2009. He later worked as a skating coach in Kyiv.

Programs

Competitive highlights 
JGP: Junior Grand Prix

References

External links
 

1990 births
2020 deaths
Ukrainian male single skaters
Sportspeople from Kyiv
Place of death missing